Novoshakhovo (Yañı Şax) is a rural locality (a selo) in Vosmomartovsky Selsoviet, Yermekeyevsky District, Bashkortostan, Russia. The population was 262 as of 2010. There are three streets.

Geography 
Novoshakhovo is located 49 km south of Yermekeyevo (the district's administrative centre) by road. Novoturayevo is the nearest rural locality.

References 

Rural localities in Yermekeyevsky District